Lawton Redman (born June 14, 1976) is an American biathlete. He competed in the men's sprint event at the 2002 Winter Olympics.

References

External links
 

1976 births
Living people
American male biathletes
Olympic biathletes of the United States
Biathletes at the 2002 Winter Olympics
People from Middlebury, Vermont
U.S. Army World Class Athlete Program
21st-century American people